Jared Hess (born November 13, 1983 in Oklahoma City, Oklahoma) is a retired American mixed martial artist. He is most known for his stint fighting for Bellator Fighting Championships in their middleweight division. He was runner up in the middleweight tournament after losing to Hector Lombard.

Biography
Hess grew up in Oklahoma City, Oklahoma and attend Western Heights High School, Oklahoma City. While in high school, Hess was a standout football player and wrestler. His freshman year, his wrestling team went 2-8 but Hess was state champion for his weight. Hess had his first child in 2002 during his senior year. 

After high school, Hess attended University of Central Oklahoma and graduated in 2007 with a degree in Industrial Safety and Criminal Justice. He also wrestled and was an All-American his senior year. One time he went on a trip to Las Vegas to watch one of his best friends get married and back out of doing the bungee jump at the  stratosphere hotel.

Mixed martial arts

Bellator Fighting Championships
Hess entered the Bellator middleweight tournament on April 17, 2009. His first fight was against Daniel Tabera, Hess won the fight after taking Tabera down and applying a rear naked choke submission early in round one.

Hess then fought in the next round of the middleweight tournament against Yosmany Cabezas at Bellator 9. Hess won the fight via technical knockout in the third round.

In the finals of the middleweight tournament at the main event of Bellator 12, Hess lost to Cuban fighter Hector Lombard. The fight ended in a TKO doctor stoppage due to multiple cuts, which occurred from elbows delivered on the ground by Lombard.

Hess returned for the second season tournament in April 2010, hoping to get a rematch with Lombard and win the middleweight title. His first fight was against former IFL middleweight champion Ryan McGivern, whom he defeated via submission.  

Hess lost his semi-final bout against Alexander Shlemenko on May 27. Despite controlling the first two rounds, Hess was on the receiving end of a flying knee from Shlemenko midway through the third round. As a result of the strike, Hess fell awkwardly on his left leg and severely dislocated his knee, causing the referee to stop the bout. His knee required surgery and kept him out of action for six months.

At Bellator 42, Hess returned from his knee injury at Bellator 20 eleven months prior. He fought Chris Bell on the undercard. Bell missed weight, and the fight was changed to a catchweight bout of 190 lbs. Hess dictated the pace of the fight, and won via triangle choke submission early in round one. The win earned Hess a spot in the Bellator Season Five Middleweight tournament. 

Hess' first fight in the Bellator Season Five Middleweight tournament took place on September 17, 2011, at Bellator 50 against Bryan Baker. Though he controlled round 1 with dominant ground control and effective striking, Hess lost the fight in the third round via TKO.

Hess fought Brett Cooper on the undercard of Bellator 58 on November 19, 2011. Hess lost the fight via unanimous decision. Hess was released from the promotion after the loss.

Mixed martial arts record

|-
| Loss
|align=center| 11–4–1
| Brett Cooper
| Decision (unanimous)
| Bellator 58
| 
|align=center| 3
|align=center| 5:00
|Hollywood, Florida, United States
|
|-
| Loss
|align=center| 11–3–1
| Bryan Baker
| TKO (punches)
| Bellator 50
| 
|align=center| 3
|align=center| 2:52
|Hollywood, Florida, United States
|
|-
| Win
|align=center| 11–2–1
| Chris Bell
| Submission (triangle choke)
| Bellator 42
| 
|align=center| 1
|align=center| 1:40
|Concho, Oklahoma, United States
| 
|-
| Loss
|align=center| 10–2–1
| Alexander Shlemenko
| TKO (knee injury)
| Bellator 20
| 
|align=center| 3
|align=center| 2:20
|San Antonio, Texas, United States
| 
|-
| Win
|align=center| 10–1–1
| Ryan McGivern
| Submission (guillotine choke)
| Bellator 16
| 
|align=center| 2
|align=center| 1:54
|Kansas City, Missouri, United States
| 
|-
| Win
|align=center| 9–1–1
| Keith Johnson
| Submission (rear-naked choke)
| BB 3: Holiday Havoc
| 
|align=center| 1
|align=center| 2:18
|Oklahoma City, Oklahoma, United States
| 
|-
| Loss
|align=center| 8–1–1
| Hector Lombard
| TKO (doctor stoppage)
| Bellator 12
| 
|align=center| 4
|align=center| 1:41
|Hollywood, Florida, United States
| 
|-
| Win
|align=center| 8–0–1
| Yosmany Cabezas
| TKO (punches)
| Bellator 9
| 
|align=center| 3
|align=center| 4:26
|Monroe, Louisiana, United States
| 
|-
| Win
|align=center| 7–0–1
| Daniel Tabera
| Submission (rear-naked choke)
| Bellator 4
| 
|align=center| 1
|align=center| 2:34
|Norman, Oklahoma, United States
| 
|-
| Win
|align=center| 6–0–1
| Jason Anderson
| Submission (guillotine choke)
| C3 Fights: Knockout-Rockout Weekend 1
| 
|align=center| 1
|align=center| 0:19
|Clinton, Oklahoma, United States
| 
|-
| Win
|align=center| 5–0–1
| Mike Queen
| Submission (rear naked choke)
| C3 Fights: Contenders
| 
|align=center| 1
|align=center| 2:42
|Concho, Oklahoma, United States
| 
|-
| Win
|align=center| 4–0–1
| Kristopher Flores
| TKO (cut)
| King of Kombat 3
| 
|align=center| 1
|align=center| 1:52
|Austin, Texas, United States
| 
|-
| Draw
|align=center| 3–0–1
| Nate James
| Draw
| CCCF: Heroes
| 
|align=center| 3
|align=center| N/A
|Oklahoma City, Oklahoma, United States
| 
|-
| Win
|align=center| 3–0
| Keith Richards
| Submission
| Masters of the Cage 17
| 
|align=center| 1
|align=center| 3:59
|Oklahoma City, Oklahoma, United States
| 
|-
| Win
|align=center| 2–0
| Dominic Brown
| TKO (punches)
| Masters of the Cage 16
| 
|align=center| 1
|align=center| 2:37
|Oklahoma City, Oklahoma, United States
| 
|-
| Win
|align=center| 1–0
| Richard Harris
| Submission
| Warriors of the Cage 2
| 
|align=center| 1
|align=center| 0:33
|Oklahoma City, Oklahoma, United States
|

References

External links
Bellator profile

Central Oklahoma wrestling profile

American male mixed martial artists
Mixed martial artists from Oklahoma
Middleweight mixed martial artists
Mixed martial artists utilizing collegiate wrestling
1983 births
Living people
University of Central Oklahoma alumni
Central Oklahoma Bronchos wrestlers